North Campus or Campus North may refer to:

Education
 North Campus (University of Copenhagen), Denmark
 Cornell North Campus, a residential district of Cornell University, NY, US
 Campus North School, a Buffalo public school

Other uses
 Staten Island University Hospital North Campus